The 8 Metre was a sailing event on the Sailing at the 1924 Summer Olympics program in Le Havre. A program of matches and semi-finals were scheduled. In case of a tie sail-off's could be held. 25 sailors, on 5 boats from 5 nations competed. A sixth entry from Italy did not show.

Race schedule

Course area and course configuration

Weather conditions

Results

Final results 
Competitors who scored a first or a second place in the matches were qualified (Q) for the semi-finals.

Daily standings

Notes 
 This is the first Olympic regatta where only one boat per class per country is allowed.
 In the 8 Metre, each boat has a specific design that have to stay within certain formula. The outcome of the formula must be less than 8 Metre. During these Olympic races, boats were used of the following designers:

Other information 
During the Sailing regattas at the 1924 Summer Olympics, among others, the following persons were competing in the various classes:

Further reading

References 

8 Metre
8 Metre (keelboat)